Sir Edwin William "Ted" Hicks  (9 June 1910 – 14 May 1984) was a senior Australian public servant and diplomat. He was Secretary of the Department of Defence from 1956 to 1968.

Life and career
Ted Hicks was born in Elsternwick, Melbourne, on 9 June 1910. He was educated at Haileybury College and Melbourne Grammar School. Hicks and his parents together moved to Canberra in 1927 and Hicks studied Commerce at the Canberra University College (now known as the Australian National University).

Hicks was appointed Secretary of the Department of Air in 1951, and his effectiveness there led to his appointment in 1956 as head of the Department of Defence, succeeding Frederick Shedden, who had been in the role for many years, including for the entire duration of World War II.

Hicks announced that he would retire from the Department of Defence in December 1967, to be appointed Australian High Commissioner to New Zealand from early 1968.

Hicks died in the Royal Canberra Hospital on 14 May 1984.

Awards
Hicks was made a Commander of the Order of the British Empire in May 1956 for his service as Secretary of the Department of Air. In June 1965, while Secretary of Defence, he was honoured as a Knight Bachelor.

References

1910 births
1984 deaths
Australian Commanders of the Order of the British Empire
Australian Knights Bachelor
High Commissioners of Australia to New Zealand
People educated at Melbourne Grammar School
Royal Australian Air Force officers
Royal Australian Air Force personnel of World War II
Secretaries of the Australian Department of Defence
People from Elsternwick, Victoria
People educated at Haileybury (Melbourne)
Australian National University alumni
People from Canberra